Loricariichthys maculatus is a species of catfish in the family Loricariidae. It is native to South America, where it is known from rivers, ditches, and ponds in Suriname, as well as reportedly Brazil and Uruguay. Although it has also been reported from Argentina, this is thought to be the result of a misidentification. The species reaches 26.3 cm (10.4 inches) in standard length, can weigh up to at least 130.6 g, and is believed to be a facultative air-breather.

References 

Loricariini
Fish described in 1794
Taxobox binomials not recognized by IUCN